Nawab Ghaibi Sardar Khan Chandio is a Pakistani politician and tribal chief who has been a member of the Provincial Assembly of Sindh since August 2017. He previously served in this role from May 2013 to May 2018. He is the chief of the Chandio tribe.

Early life and education
He was born on 19 April 1969 in Qambar Shahdadkot District.

He has a degree of Bachelor of Arts.

He is the chieftain of Baloch tribe Chandio.

Political career

He was elected to the Provincial Assembly of Sindh as a candidate of the  Pakistan Peoples Party (PPP) from Constituency PS-42 Qambar Shahdadkot-III in the 2013 Sindh provincial election.

He was re-elected to Provincial Assembly of Sindh as a candidate of the PPP from PS-16 Qambar Shahdadkot-III in the 2018 Sindh provincial election.

References

Living people
Sindh MPAs 2013–2018
1969 births
Pakistan People's Party MPAs (Sindh)
Sindh MPAs 2018–2023